Buroz is one of the 21 municipalities (municipios) that makes up the Venezuelan state of Miranda and, according to a 2007 population estimate by the National Institute of Statistics of Venezuela, the municipality has a population of 25,755.  The town of Mamporal is the municipal seat of the Buroz Municipality.

Demographics
The Buroz Municipality, according to a 2007 population estimate by the National Institute of Statistics of Venezuela, has a population of 25,755 (up from 21,624 in 2000). This amounts to 0.9% of the state's population.

Government
The mayor of the Buroz Municipality is Ramón Gómez Serrano, re-elected on October 31, 2004, with 68% of the vote.  The municipality is divided into one parish (Mamporal).

References

External links
 buroz-miranda.gob.ve]  

Municipalities of Miranda (state)